Sniffles Takes a Trip is a 1940 Warner Bros. Merrie Melodies cartoon directed by Chuck Jones. The short was released on May 22, 1940, and stars Sniffles the mouse.

Plot
Sniffles goes into the countryside hoping to enjoy nature there and escape city life. He finds that the countryside is very scary and gets lost. Sniffles manages to escape as he much prefers the city over the countryside.

Cast and crew
 The voice of Sniffles has been attributed to  Margaret Hill-Talbot.
 Uncredited editor: Treg Brown
 Uncredited orchestrator: Milt Franklyn
 Uuncredited layout artist: John McGrew
 Uncredited background artist: Paul Julian

Home Media
DVD - Looney Tunes Golden Collection: Volume 6 (USA 1995 Turner print added as a bonus)
DVD – Looney Tunes Mouse Chronicles: The Chuck Jones Collection

References

External links 

 

1940 films
1940 animated films
Merrie Melodies short films
Warner Bros. Cartoons animated short films
Short films directed by Chuck Jones
Animated films about animals
Animated films about mice
Films based on Aesop's Fables
1940s Warner Bros. animated short films